Steinsåsen is a village in Hole municipality in Buskerud, Norway. Steinsåsen  located on the west side of Steinsfjorden, the eastern arm of Tyrifjorden. The village is about 9 km southeast of Honefoss. European route E16 passes through Steinsåsen as it travels from Oslo to Bergen.

Steinsåsen is principally a residential area.  Its population was 1,909 as of 1 January 2016 which probably includes the village of Vik which is located just south of Steinsåsen.

References

Villages in Buskerud
Hole, Norway